Democratic People's Republic of Korea women's national under-17 football team represents North Korea in international youth women football competitions. It has reached the World Cup Finals on three occasions, and won gold medals on the 2008 and 2016 editions.

FIFA U-17 Women's World Cup record

AFC U-17 Women's Asian Cup record

Current squad
Squad for the 2016 FIFA U-17 Women's World Cup.

Previous squads
2008 FIFA U-17 Women's World Cup
2010 FIFA U-17 Women's World Cup
2012 FIFA U-17 Women's World Cup
2014 FIFA U-17 Women's World Cup
2016 FIFA U-17 Women's World Cup
2018 FIFA U-17 Women's World Cup

See also

North Korea women's national football team
North Korea women's national under-20 football team

References

External links 
Team profile - soccerway.com

Asian women's national under-17 association football teams
Under